Fillan is a former municipality in the old Sør-Trøndelag county, Norway. The  municipality existed from 1886 until its dissolution in 1964. It is now part of the municipality of Hitra in Trøndelag county. The municipality included the northeastern part of the island of Hitra surrounding the Fillfjorden, plus about 100 islands, islets, and skerries—including Fjellværsøya and Ulvøya. The administrative centre of the municipality was the village of Fillan. Other villages in the municipality included Ansnes, Nordbotn, and Ulvan.

The former municipality had a church and a chapel in it, both of which now form a parish within the present-day municipality of Hitra. The Fillan church is located in the village of Fillan and the Nordbotn chapel is located on the island of Fjellværsøya.

History
The municipality of Fillan was established on 1 January 1886 when it was separated from the municipality of Hitra to form a municipality of its own. The initial population of the new municipality was 2,241. During the 1960s, there were many municipal mergers across Norway due to the work of the Schei Committee. On 1 January 1964, the neighboring municipalities of Fillan, Sandstad, Kvenvær, and Hitra were merged to re-form the old pre-1886 Hitra municipality. Prior to the merger, Fillan had 1,759 residents.

Name
The municipality (originally the parish) is named after the old Fillan farm ( or ) since the first Fillan Church was built there. The name is likely the original name for the local Fillfjorden, but the name's meaning is uncertain.

Media gallery

Government
During its existence, this municipality was governed by a municipal council of elected representatives, which in turn elected a mayor.

Municipal council
The municipal council  of Fillan was made up of 17 representatives that were elected to four year terms. The party breakdown of the final municipal council was as follows:

Mayors
The mayors of Fillan:

 1914–1916: Petter Hansen Eidsvaag
 1917–1922: Olaus Selvaag (FV)
 1922–1931: Ole B. Tranvik (FV)
 1932–1937: Harald Alfred Eriksen (V)
 1938–1941: Anton A. Fjellvær (V)
 1943–1945: Harald Christian Kjesbu (NS)
 1945-1945: Anton A. Fjellvær (V)
 1946–1947: Harald Alfred Eriksen (V)
 1948–1963: Arne Schanche Nilsen (Bp)

See also
List of former municipalities of Norway

References

Hitra
Former municipalities of Norway
1886 establishments in Norway
1964 disestablishments in Norway